St. Andrews Bay may refer to:

St. Andrews Bay (Florida), United States
St Andrews Bay (Fife), Scotland
St Andrews Bay, South Georgia